Omukama wa Bunyoro  Translates to The King of Bunyoro is the title given to rulers of the East African kingdom of Bunyoro-Kitara.  The kingdom lasted as an independent state from the 16th to the 19th century. The Omukama of Bunyoro remains an important figure in Ugandan politics, especially among the Banyoro people of whom he is the titular head. He is closely related to the Omukama of Toro Kingdom.

The Royal Palace, called Ekikaali Karuziika, (Karuziika Palace) is located in Hoima. The current Omukama is Rukirabasaija Solomon Iguru I Gafabusa Amooti and his wife is Omugo (the Queen) Margaret Karunga Adyeri. As a cultural head, the King is assisted by his Principal Private Secretary, a Cabinet of 21 Ministers and  Orukurato (a Parliament).

Constitutional recognition
In 1962, the United Kingdom granted independence to Uganda. In February 1966, Prime Minister Milton Obote suspended the constitution and seized power, abolishing all of the traditional kingdoms—including Bunyoro—in 1967. The Omukama (King) of Bunyoro-Kitara Kingdom was reinstated by Statute No. 8 of 1993, enacted by the Parliament of Uganda after the monarchy had been abolished for many years. Unlike the pre-1967 Omukama, who was both titular head and a political figure of the government of Bunyoro, the Omukama today is a cultural leader above partisan politics, although the king remains the titular head of the Bunyoro regional government.

Article 246 of the 1995 Ugandan constitution provides:

246. Institution of traditional or cultural leaders.
     (1) Subject to the provisions of this Constitution, the institution of traditional leader or cultural leader may exist in any area of Uganda in accordance with the culture, customs and traditions or wishes and aspirations of the people to whom it applies.
     (2) In any community, where the issue of traditional or cultural leader has not been resolved, the issue shall be resolved by the community concerned using a method prescribed by Parliament.
     (3) The following provisions shall apply in relation to traditional leaders or cultural leaders—
          (a) the institution of traditional leader or a cultural leader shall be a corporation sole with perpetual succession and with capacity to sue and be sued and to hold assets or properties in trust for itself and the people concerned;
          (b) nothing in paragraph (a) shall be taken to prohibit a traditional leader or cultural leader from holding any asset or property acquired in a personal capacity;
          (c) a traditional leader or cultural leader shall enjoy such privileges and benefits as may be conferred by the Government and local government or as that leader may be entitled to under culture, custom and tradition;
          (d) subject to paragraph (c) of this clause, no person shall be compelled to pay allegiance or contribute to the cost of maintaining a traditional leader or cultural leader;
          (e) a person shall not, while remaining a traditional leader or cultural leader, join or participate in partisan politics;
          (f) a traditional leader or cultural leader shall not have or exercise any administrative, legislative or executive powers of Government or local government.
     (4) The allegiance and privileges accorded to a traditional leader or a cultural leader by virtue of that office shall not be regarded as a discriminatory practice prohibited under article 21 of this Constitution; but any custom, practice, usage or tradition relating to a traditional leader or cultural leader which detracts from the rights of any person as guaranteed by this Constitution, shall be taken to be prohibited under that article.
     (5) For the avoidance of doubt, the institution of traditional leader or cultural leader existing immediately before the coming into force of this Constitution shall be taken to exist in accordance with the provisions of this Constitution.
     (6) For the purposes of this article, "traditional leader or cultural leader" means a king or similar traditional leader or cultural leader by whatever name called, who derives allegiance from the fact of birth or descent in accordance with the customs, traditions, usage or consent of the people led by that traditional or cultural leader.

Etymology of Omukama
Omukama means ‘the milker’, as the leader of the kingdom provides his citizens with food and wealth. The word comes from Runyoro-Rutooro omu- (singular human-being class prefix) and -kama ‘to milk’, which ultimately comes from Proto-Bantu kám ‘squeeze, wring’.

In modern Runyoro-Rutooro, however, dropping the initial vowel of this word (mukama ‘boss, sir’) changes its meaning considerably.

History of the Omukama of Bunyoro-Kitara dynasties

Babiito dynasty
The Bachwezi dynasty was followed by the Babiito dynasty of the current Omukama of Bunyoro-Kitara. Any attempt to pinpoint the dates of this, or any other dynasty before it, is pure conjecture; as there were no written records at the time. Modern day historians place the beginning of the Babiito dynasty at around the time of the invasion of Bunyoro by the Luo from the North. The first mubiito (singular) king was Isingoma Mpuga Rukidi I, whose reign is placed around the 14th century. To date, there have been a total of 27 Babiito kings of Bunyoro-Kitara.

Source: The official Bunyoro-Kitara Kingdom website

List of Omukamas of the Babiito dynasty
Rukidi of Bunyoro, late fifteenth century
Ocaki of Bunyoro, late fifteenth/early sixteenth century
Oyo Nyiba of Bunyoro, early sixteenth century
Winyi I of Bunyoro, early sixteenth century
Olimi I of Bunyoro, mid sixteenth century
Nyabongo of Bunyoro, mid sixteenth century
Winyi II of Bunyoro, late sixteenth century/early seventeenth century
Olimi II of Bunyoro, mid seventeenth century
Nyarwa of Bunyoro, mid seventeenth century
Cwamali of Bunyoro, mid seventeenth century
Masamba of Bunyoro, late seventeenth century
Anabwani I of Bunyoro, late seventeenth century
Kyebambe I of Bunyoro, late seventeenth century
Winyi III of Bunyoro, early eighteenth century
Nyaika of Bunyoro, early eighteenth century
Kyebambe II of Bunyoro, early eighteenth century
Olimi III of Bunyoro,  1710–1731
Duhaga of Bunyoro, 1731– 1782
Olimi IV of Bunyoro,  1782–1786
Nyamutukura Kyebambe III of Bunyoro, 1786–1835
Nyabongo II of Bunyoro, 1835–1848
Olimi V of Bunyoro, 1848–1852
Kyebambe IV of Bunyoro, 1852–1869
Kabalega of Bunyoro, 1869–1898
Kitahimbwa of Bunyoro, 1898–1902
Duhaga II of Bunyoro, 1902–1924
Winyi IV of Bunyoro, 1925–1967
Monarchy discontinued by the Ugandan government, 1967–1994
Solomon Iguru I, 1994–present

References 

Bunyoro
Ugandan monarchies
15th-century establishments in Africa

lt:Omukama